Ioannis Dimokostoulas was a Greek politician.

Biography 
He was born in Sourpi, Magnesia. He was elected MP for Larisa in the August 1910 Greek legislative election.

References 

MPs of Larissa
People from Sourpi
Year of birth missing
Year of death missing
Greek MPs 1910 (August–November)